Cymindis emetzi is a species of ground beetle in the subfamily Harpalinae. It was described by Mikhailov in 1997.

References

emetzi
Beetles described in 1997